I'll Have Another... Christmas Album is the sixth studio album by American men's singing group Straight No Chaser. It was released in the United States on October 28, 2016, and peaked at number 53 on the US Billboard 200.

Track listing

Charts

Release history

References 

Christmas albums by American artists
2016 Christmas albums
A cappella Christmas albums
Atlantic Records albums
Straight No Chaser (group) albums